Kharsan (formerly known Ras al-Ayn) is a Syrian village located in the Hamraa Subdistrict of the Hama District in Hama Governorate. According to the Syria Central Bureau of Statistics (CBS), Kharsan had a population of 931 in the 2004 census. Its inhabitants are predominantly Alawites.

References

Alawite communities in Syria
Populated places in Hama District